Khanum Elshad-Kysy Velieva (born 10 April 1999) is a Russian freestyle wrestler. She is a bronze medalist at the World Wrestling Championships and a two-time medalist, including gold, at the European Wrestling Championships. In 2021, she competed at the 2020 Summer Olympics in Tokyo, Japan.

Career 

Of Azerbaijani origin, Velieva won one of the bronze medals in the women's 69kg event at the 2017 European U23 Wrestling Championship held in Szombathely, Hungary. In 2018, she won the silver medal in the women's 68 kg event at the European U23 Wrestling Championship held in Istanbul, Turkey. At the 2018 World U23 Wrestling Championship held in Bucharest, Romania, she won one of the bronze medals in the women's 68kg event.

In 2019, she won one of the bronze medals in the women's 68kg event at the Golden Grand Prix Ivan Yarygin held in Krasnoyarsk, Russia. She also won the silver medal in the women's 68kg event at the 2019 European U23 Wrestling Championship held in Novi Sad, Serbia. In the same year, she represented Russia at the Military World Games held in Wuhan, China and she won one of the bronze medals in the 68 kg event.

At the Golden Grand Prix Ivan Yarygin 2020, she won the gold medal in the women's 68kg event. At the 2020 European Wrestling Championships held in Rome, Italy, she won the gold medal in the 68 kg event. In the final, she defeated Dalma Caneva of Italy. In that same year, she also won one of the bronze medals in the women's 68 kg event at the Individual Wrestling World Cup held in Belgrade, Serbia.

In March 2021, she qualified at the European Qualification Tournament to compete at the 2020 Summer Olympics in Tokyo, Japan. A month later, she won the silver medal in the 68 kg event at the 2021 European Wrestling Championships held in Warsaw, Poland.

She competed in the women's 68 kg event at the 2020 Summer Olympics where she won her first match against Danielle Lappage of Canada and she was then eliminated in her second match by Soronzonboldyn Battsetseg of Mongolia. Two months after the Olympics, she won one of the bronze medals in the women's 68 kg event at the 2021 World Wrestling Championships in Oslo, Norway. In her bronze medal match she defeated Olivia Di Bacco of Canada.

In January 2022, she won the gold medal in the women's 68 kg event at the Golden Grand Prix Ivan Yarygin held in Krasnoyarsk, Russia. In February 2022, she won one of the bronze medals in the women's 68 kg event at the Yasar Dogu Tournament held in Istanbul, Turkey.

Achievements

References

External links 

 

Living people
1999 births
Sportspeople from Krasnoyarsk
Russian female sport wrestlers
European Wrestling Championships medalists
World Wrestling Championships medalists
Wrestlers at the 2020 Summer Olympics
Olympic wrestlers of Russia
Russian sportspeople of Azerbaijani descent
European Wrestling Champions
21st-century Russian women